The 3rd World Festival of Youth and Students featured an athletics competition among its programme of events. The events were contested in East Berlin, East Germany in August 1951. Mainly contested among Eastern European athletes, it served as an alternative to the more Western European-oriented 1951 Summer International University Sports Week held in Luxembourg the same year.

The calibre of the competition improved at the 3rd edition of the competition, with six athletes successfully returning and defending their titles from the 1949 competition. Among the most prominent of these was Leonid Shcherbakov, the triple jump winner at the 1950 European Athletics Championships a year earlier. European bronze medallist Olli Partanen was runner-up in the discus throw to AAA Championships winner Ferenc Klics.

The 1948 Olympic long jump champion Olga Gyarmati won the 200 metres but was defeated in her Olympic event by Aleksandra Chudina who won four individual titles; her other victories came in the 80 metres hurdles, high jump, and women's pentathlon. The women's throwing events here presaged the 1952 Summer Olympics, as shot put winner Galina Zybina and discus throw champion Nina Ponomaryova added Olympic gold to their World Student titles. Six other medal-winning Soviet athletes reached the Olympic podium the following year: Nadezhda Khnykina, Klavdiya Tochonova, Vladimir Sukharev, Levan Sanadze, Vladimir Kazantsev and Yuriy Lituyev. The Soviet Union was dominant at the event, winning all but seven of the 34 events on offer.

Medal summary

Men

Women

 Times possibly wind-assisted

Medal table

References

Results
World Student Games (UIE). GBR Athletics. Retrieved on 2014-12-09.

World Festival of Youth and Students
World Festival of Youth and Students
International athletics competitions hosted by Hungary
20th century in Budapest
International sports competitions in Budapest
1951